Jorge López (born 26 August 1943) is a Cuban rower. He competed in the men's coxed four event at the 1968 Summer Olympics.

References

1943 births
Living people
Cuban male rowers
Olympic rowers of Cuba
Rowers at the 1968 Summer Olympics
Place of birth missing (living people)
Pan American Games medalists in rowing
Pan American Games bronze medalists for Cuba
Rowers at the 1967 Pan American Games